The Max Planck Institute for the Science of Human History performs basic research into archaeological science. The institute is one of 80+ research institutes of the Max Planck Society and is located in Jena, Germany.

History

Max Planck Institute of Economics 
The predecessor of the present institute was founded in 1993 as the Max Planck Institute for Research into Economic Systems (Max-Planck-Institut zur Erforschung von Wirtschaftssystemen) and later renamed the Max Planck Institute of Economics (Max-Planck-Institut für Ökonomik). Its initial mission was researching the transition of the former Eastern European socialist economic systems, but it later researched a broad set of problems relating to change in modern economies more generally, including evolutionary economics, experimental economics, and entrepreneurial studies.

It was organized into three research units: 
 Evolutionary Economics Group (director: Ulrich Witt)
 Strategic Interaction Group (director: Werner Güth)
 Entrepreneurship, Growth and Public Policy Group (director: David B. Audretsch)

Present-day
In March 2014, the institute was renamed the Max Planck Institute for History and the Sciences. A few months later, on November 21, 2014, the Institute of Economics was realigned and renamed to the Max Planck Institute for the Science of Human History. From 2016, it consisted of three interdisciplinary research departments that integrate methods and research questions from the natural sciences and the humanities: the Department of Archaeogenetics, led by Johannes Krause, the Department of Linguistic and Cultural Evolution, led by Russell Gray, and the Department of Archaeology, led by Nicole Boivin. In 2015 it took over from the Max Planck Institute for Evolutionary Anthropology the task of maintaining the Glottolog. In October 2021, Boivin was removed from her position, after an investigation found evidence of "workplace misconduct and bullying".

In June 2022, the Max Planck Society announced that it would rename the institute as the Max Planck Institute for Geoanthropology.

Location 
The institute is located on Kahlaische Strasse, about 1 km south-east of the city center.  It is housed in an attractively restored Victorian villa, linked by a glass bridge to a much larger modern building, which includes offices and other facilities for each of the research units, each unit having one floor of the main section of the building.

Administration
The director of the institute is:
 Jonathan Gershenzon (Managing Director)

References

External links
 Website for the Max Planck Institute for the Science of Human History
 Website for the former Max Planck Institute of Economics

 
Science of Human History
Research institutes established in 1993
Anthropological research institutes
Genetics or genomics research institutions
Buildings and structures in Jena